The Department of Science and Technology was an Australian government department that existed between November 1980 and December 1984.

History
The department was created by the Fraser Government, joining the Department of Productivity with the Department of Science and the Environment, having received advice from the Australian Science and Technology Council that there would be merit in merging the two departments.

The department was abolished by the Hawke Government in December 1984, making way for the new Department of Industry, Technology and Commerce.

Scope
Information about the department's functions and/or government funding allocation could be found in the Administrative Arrangements Orders, the annual Portfolio Budget Statements and in the department's annual reports.

According to the Administrative Arrangements Order (AAO) made on 3 November 1980, the department dealt with:
Science and Technology including research, support of research and support of civil space research programs
Productivity of industry
Patents of inventions and designs, and trade marks
Meteorology
Ionospheric prediction services
Analytical laboratory services
Weights and measures

Structure
The department was an Australian Public Service department, staffed by officials who were responsible to the Ministers for Science and Technology.

References

Science and Technology
Ministries established in 1980
History of science and technology in Australia